Picaresqueties is a five-track EP released by the band The Decemberists as a companion disc to the double-vinyl edition of their LP Picaresque. It contains previously unreleased material from the Picaresque recording sessions.

Besides being packaged with Picaresque on vinyl, Picaresqueties can also be purchased from the iTunes Store, eMusic, and Amazon MP3.

Track listing
All songs written by Colin Meloy, except where noted.

2006 EPs